This is a list of flag bearers who have represented Burundi at the Olympics.

Flag bearers carry the national flag of their country at the opening ceremony of the Olympic Games.

See also
Burundi at the Olympics

References

Burundi at the Olympics
Burundi
Olympic